Kiseljak is a village in the municipalities of Zvornik (Republika Srpska) and Sapna, Bosnia and Herzegovina.

Demographics 
According to the 2013 census, its population was 363, all of them living in the Zvornik part, thus none in the Sapna part.

References

Populated places in Sapna
Populated places in Zvornik